Diesel Loco Shed, Sabarmati is an locomotive maintenance shed located in Sabarmati, Gujarat in India. It is located east of Sabarmati falling under Ahmedabad railway division. The shed caters to the needs of freight as well as passenger
trains.

It is one of three diesel loco sheds in the Western Railway zone, the others are Ratlam and Vatva . One of the last remaining major MG loco sheds.

History 

It was established on 8 July 1978  with a holding capacity of 55 YDM-3 and YDM-5 locomotives, but  50 WDG4 where added to the Loco Shed in 2008 and it was fully operational in 2009. The first EMD loco no. 12224 WDG4 arrived at Sabarmati shed in July 2009. All locos received by the shed are from Banaras Locomotive Works, Varanasi, India.

The shed currently holds around 50 EMD BG Locos and 150 MG Locos. It has 45 YDM-4/4A locos locomotives out of which 27 MG locos in passenger services and giving inferior service.

Nine YDM-4 locos from here have been sold to Togorail and shipped to Togo.

Major and minor schedules of Diesel Locomotives are carried out in the shed. The shed is ISO: ISO 9002:2001, ISO 14001, ISO 9001:2008 certified.

Locomotives

See also 

 Diesel Loco Shed, Mhow
 Diesel Loco Shed, Vatva

References

External links 

 Railway Board - Official Website
 Western Railway - Official Website

S
1978 establishments in Gujarat
Transport infrastructure completed in 1978